Noctileptura seriata is the species of the Lepturinae subfamily in long-horned beetle family. This beetle is distributed in Guatemala, and Honduras.

References

Lepturinae
Beetles described in 1984